Amsterdam Zuid may refer to:
Amsterdam-Zuid, a borough of Amsterdam
Amsterdam Zuid station, a Dutch railway station